Louis Stoop was a Belgian gymnast. He competed in the men's team all-around event at the 1920 Summer Olympics, winning the silver medal.

References

External links

Year of birth missing
Year of death missing
Belgian male artistic gymnasts
Olympic gymnasts of Belgium
Gymnasts at the 1920 Summer Olympics
Olympic silver medalists for Belgium
Medalists at the 1920 Summer Olympics
Olympic medalists in gymnastics
Place of birth missing